The Wonderbox: Curious Histories of How to Live is a 2012 book by Roman Krznaric. It explores aspects of the human psyche, and makes the case for people to empathise more with each other. The book uses broad range of historical examples.

References

External links
Wonderbox (Author Website)

2012 non-fiction books
Profile Books books